The John A. and Martha Robertson House is located in Lodi, Wisconsin, United States. It was added to the National Register of Historic Places in 2009.

History
The house was built by John Robertson. Robertson moved to Lodi from Vienna, Wisconsin in 1897.

References

Houses in Columbia County, Wisconsin
Houses completed in 1897
Houses on the National Register of Historic Places in Wisconsin
Queen Anne architecture in Wisconsin
Lodi, Wisconsin
1897 establishments in Wisconsin
National Register of Historic Places in Columbia County, Wisconsin